Boulder Dash is the video-game series.

Boulder Dash may also refer to:
 Boulder Dash (roller coaster)

See also:
 Balderdash (disambiguation)